David Herzog (born October 18, 1946) is an American expert on eating disorders research and treatment. He was one of the first doctors to advocate that treatments for bulimia, anorexia and other eating disorders include both psychotherapy and medical and nutritional monitoring, as well as careful follow up after patients recover. Today he is a researcher, teacher and advocate. Much of his work has focused on changing the way the fashion industry uses models.

Education
A native of Newark, New Jersey, Herzog graduated from the National Autonomous University of Mexico School of Medicine in 1973. He trained in pediatrics at the University of Wisconsin, Madison, and at Boston City Hospital. He trained in child and adolescent psychiatry at Children's Hospital and Judge Baker Guidance Center in Boston, and in general psychiatry at Massachusetts General Hospital (MGH).

Early career
After Herzog completed his residency in general psychiatry at MGH in 1980, he went on the full-time staff to serve the hospital in various capacities, including Director of the Child Psychiatry Consultation-Liaison Service to Pediatrics, and Director of the Eating Disorders Unit in the Division of Child Psychiatry.

Eating disorder research, treatment and advocacy
Throughout his career, Herzog has spoken out against using underage and underweight models, and supported increased intervention in the fashion industry, including from the government. In May 2012, Herzog helped editors of all 19 international editions of Vogue take a decision to ban models that may be suffering from eating disorders or are younger than 16.

He heads the largest longitudinal study of eating disorders in the country, in its 25th year in 2012. Herzog has published more than 250 papers, founded or co-founded the Eating Disorders Research Society, the Academy for Eating Disorders, the Eating Disorders Coalition, and the Harvard Eating Disorders Center, now the Harris Center for Education and Advocacy in Eating Disorders at MGH.

Herzog helped organize the annual Harris Center Public Forums, which are held every spring at Harvard University, since 1997. The forum creates dialogue about media, culture and body image, and has attracted speakers like Anna Wintour, Editor of Vogue, Diane von Furstenberg, President of the Council of Fashion Designers of America, and Arianna Huffington, Editor of the Huffington Post. Herzog also organizes, moderates or attends speaking opportunities beyond the Harris Center to raise general awareness of eating disorders and the need for more research. Speakers that Herzog has worked with include designer Michael Kors and supermodel Natalia Vodianova.

Herzog is an Endowed Professor in Psychiatry in the Field of Eating Disorders at Harvard Medical School.

References

Physicians from Newark, New Jersey
Harvard Medical School faculty
1946 births
Living people
National Autonomous University of Mexico alumni
American psychiatrists